Free Woman (자유처녀 - Jayu cheonyeo) is a 1982 South Korean film directed by Kim Ki-young.

Plot
A melodrama about a Korean woman who has lived in Spain pursuing her Ph.D. in Korea.

Cast
Ahn So-young
Shin Seong-il
Kim Won-seop
Han Seong-gyeong
Kim Chung-chul
Cho Ju-mi
Han U-ri
Kim Seong-geun
Lee Yeong-ho
Yoo Myeong-sun

References

Bibliography

External links

1980s Korean-language films
South Korean drama films
Films directed by Kim Ki-young